The 1993–94 Latvian Hockey League season was the third season of the Latvian Hockey League, the top level of ice hockey in Latvia. Seven teams participated in the league, and Pardaugava Riga won the championship.

Regular season

Final round

External links
 Season hockeyarchives.info

Latvian Hockey League
Latvian Hockey League seasons
Latvian